Bala Gabri (also Romanized as Bālā Gabrī; also known as Bālā Gīrī and Bālā Kobrá) is a village in Qarah Su Rural District, in the Central District of Kermanshah County, Kermanshah Province, Iran. At the 2006 census, its population was 93, in 20 families.

References 

Populated places in Kermanshah County